Carlos Borcosque Jr. (born July 13, 1943) is an Argentine  film director and screenplay writer.

He is the son of director Carlos Borcosque.

Selected filmography
 Santos Vega (1971)

External links

1943 births
Argentine film directors
Argentine screenwriters
Male screenwriters
Argentine male writers
Living people